Kurukshetra district is one of the 22 districts of Haryana state in northern India. The town of Kurukshetra, a sacred place for the Hindus, is the administrative headquarters of this district. The district occupies an area of 1530.00 km². The district has a population of 964,655 (2011 census). This district is part of Ambala division. Kurukshetra is also the land of Srimad Bhagawad Gita. Jyotisar is the place in Kurukshetra where Krishna is believed to deliver the sermon of Gita to Arjuna in the Mahabharata.

Origin of name

The district derived its name from the ancient region of Kurukshetra, which literally means the land of the Kurus. It is believed that the Kurukshetra war described in the Puranas and the war was fought here and Shri Krishna preached the Bhagavat Gita to Arjuna on the battlefield before the war.

History
The district was carved out from the erstwhile Karnal district in 1973. Later some parts of this district were transferred to Kaithal and Yamuna Nagar districts at the time of their creation.

Sub-Divisions
The Kurukshetra district is headed by an IAS officer of the rank of Deputy Commissioner (DC) who is the chief executive officer of the district. The district is divided into 4 sub-divisions, each headed by a Sub-Divisional Magistrate (SDM): Shahabad, Thanesar, Ladwa and Pehowa.

Revenue tehsils
The district has 4 revenue tehsils, namely, Thanesar, Pehowa, Shahabad and Ladwa and 2 sub-tehsils - Babain and Ismailabad.

Demographics

According to the 2011 census Kurukshetra district has a population of 964,655, roughly equal to the nation of Fiji or the US state of Montana. This gives it a ranking of 452nd in India (out of a total of 640). 
Its population growth rate over the decade 2001-2011 was 16.81%. Kurukshetra has a sex ratio of 889 females for every 1000 males, and a literacy rate of 76.7%. Scheduled Castes make up 22.30% of the population.

Languages 

At the time of the 2011 Census of India, 65.81% of the population in the district spoke Hindi, 17.47% Punjabi and 15.22% Haryanvi as their first language.

Education 

Kurukshetra University was established as a unitary residential university at Kurukshetra in 1956. The Regional Engineering College at Kurukshetra was established in 1963, which was later renamed as National Institute of Technology. Kurukshetra has recently got two reputed institutions in the form of National Institute of Design and National Institute of Electronics & Information Technology (NIELIT). Apart from these, the Institute of Hotel Management at Jyotisar is also known.

Transport

Kurukshetra Junction railway station is a junction station at the junction of Delhi–Kalka line and Kurukshetra–Jind branch line. It is located in the Indian state of Haryana. It serves Kurukshetra and Thanesar city.

Events

Gita Mahotsav 
Kurukshetra is not just the land known as the land of Mahabharta; it is also known for the Philosophy of Life and Karma given to Arjuna by Lord Krishna . For more than 2000 years now, Srimad Bhagawad Gita has emerged as the one scripture which is free from the tags of religions and communities. It is equally reverend all over the world for the message of Selfless Karma which is much relevant in all ages.

Kurukshetra has been celebrating Gita Mahotsav (Gita Jayanti). For long it was known as Kurukshetra Utsav. In 2016, the Haryana Government decided to give it a global fervor and organised annual International Gita Mahotsav at Kurukshetra from 1 December to 11 December. The Gita Jayanti was celebrated on 10 December as per the traditional calendar. In 2016, over 01 Million  people visited the events.

References

External links 

 Kurukshetra district government website
 Official map of Haryana, showing the cities of Kurukshetra district, hosted on the official website of local government

 
Districts of Haryana
1973 establishments in Haryana